Kunisada is a crater on Mercury. Its name was adopted by the International Astronomical Union in 2009. Kunisada is named for the Japanese woodblock printer Utagawa Kunisada, who lived from 1786 to 1864.

References

Impact craters on Mercury